Wim Odilia Georges Taymans is a Belgian software developer based in Malaga, Spain. Taymans started his career in multimedia development on the Commodore 64 writing various games and demos. He was known in the Commodore 64 coding community under the nickname The Wim. In 1990 he was the coder behind the C64 game Puffy's Saga which was distributed by Ubisoft. He later moved on to the Amiga where he among other things wrote a version of the classic game Boulder Dash.

In 1994 he installed the Linux operating system on his Amiga and has since been involved with the development of various multimedia technologies for the Linux platform. His first efforts on Linux were some assembly optimizations for the rtjpeg library; later, he worked on the Trinity video editor before teaming up with Erik Walthinsen to create the GStreamer multimedia framework.

In 2004 he started working for Fluendo in Spain as employee number 3. While working for Fluendo he designed and wrote most of what today is the 0.10 release series of GStreamer. In July 2007 he left Fluendo together with many of the other GStreamer developers and joined up with United Kingdom company Collabora. As part of his job at Collabora he maintained and developed GStreamer further, with the aim of providing Linux and other Unix and Unix-like operating systems with a competitive and powerful multimedia framework. In November 2013, Taymans started a new endeavour as a Principal Software Engineer at Red Hat spending most of his time working on upstream GStreamer.

Taymans was the main architect and developer behind the GStreamer 1.0 release which came out on September 24, 2012.

In July 2015 it was announced that Taymans was designing and writing Pinos, which became PipeWire, from his position as Principal Engineer at Red Hat. PipeWire is a server for handling audio and video streams on Linux.

References

External links
 C64.org profile page
 GStreamer
 Fluendo
 Collabora
 Interview with Wim Taymans by Audio Libre

1972 births
Living people
Video game programmers
Free software programmers
Belgian computer programmers